Jeffrey Howard Dinitz (born 1952) is an American mathematician who taught combinatorics at the University of Vermont. He is best known for proposing the Dinitz conjecture, which became a major theorem.

Early life and education 
Dinitz was born in 1952 in Brooklyn, New York City, New York.

XFL scheduling 
Dinitz is also well known for scheduling the first season of the now-defunct XFL football league. He and a colleague from the Czech Republic, Dalibor Froncek, offered the then-brand-new XFL league their expertise to draft complicated schedules. 

The XFL administration quickly agreed, which "surprised" Dinitz greatly. After some time on the computer, Dinitz and Froncek sent the XFL a draft schedule, and the new league gratefully accepted. Although the XFL folded after only one season, Dinitz was happy that "(he and Froncek) got to go to the championship game in Los Angeles".

Personal life 
Dinitz is married to Susan Dinitz and has three children, Mike, Amy, and Tom.

Bibliography
 Handbook of Combinatorial Designs, Second Edition by Charles J. Colbourn and Jeffrey H. Dinitz, 2006
 CRC Handbook of Combinatorial Designs by Charles J. Colbourn and Jeffrey H. Dinitz, 1996
 Contemporary Design Theory: A Collection of Surveys by Jeffrey H. Dinitz and Douglas R. Stinson, 1992

References

External links
 Home Page at University of Vermont
 Copy of New York Times article
 

1952 births
Living people
20th-century American mathematicians
21st-century American mathematicians
Ohio State University alumni